Rigging in entertainment can be broken down into two main subjects – theatrical rigging and arena-style rigging. All the same skills apply in both genres. The first takes place in a theatre, and typically involves the theatre's permanent fly system. The other in an arena or "exposed structure venue" such as a convention center, ballroom, warehouse etc.

Circus rigging, comprising aerial acrobatic apparatuses that support human beings under dynamic loading conditions, and stabilization rigging for large scale fabric tension structures (big tops), is, perhaps, under appreciated in the general rigging field, and may be considered by some to be a separate field. However, the principles of physics and the standards of engineering that apply to theatrical and arena rigging still hold true in circus rigging, and much of the same equipment and many of the same devices are commonly used. All the same skills apply in this genre as well.

Chain motors and trusses are not used as often in tented circuses as in arena or theater rigging, however arena circuses make regular use of them. In both tented and arena circuses, crane-bars or frames stabilized by guy cables, hung from fiber rope block and tackle systems are common, as are systems supporting and tensioning safety nets.

High (or low) wire rigging, while simple in principle and application, requires substantial load-path capacity, as wire walkers generally require high tension in their systems.

Automation rigging is used by many circuses, to fly both human beings and scenic or prop elements.

In theatrical rigging the venue may have anything from a dead pull scenery flying system, a hemp rigging system, a counterweight rigging system, a winch or hoist driven automated rigging system, or any hybrid of the aforementioned, used to fly Lighting, Video, Audio, props, people and scenery.

Stations
Both of these rigging disciplines have four basic stations.

Ground rigger
Maintains safe perimeters underneath high work being done, maintains a safe path and perimeter around aerial work platforms, monitors the movement of aerial work platforms, assembles rigging on the ground for high work being done, attaches gear and assemblies to lines for high work being done, marks or "lays" out points on the floor and moves designators for high work (rigging points and laser plumbs), assembles and checks out motion control systems, makes attachments to lifting frames, lighting trusses, audio, video and scenery for hoisting or flying, does visual and mechanical safety inspections.

Bucket rigger
Has all of the skills and responsibility of a ground rigger and must also be able to operate an aerial work platform, must be able to identify suitable structure and attachment for rigging, must be able to lift 100 lbs, must have advanced rope skills, be able to apply rope work mechanical advantages, as well as knowledge of materials, manufacturing methods and the proper applications of different rigging systems..

High rigger/Up rigger
Is virtually identical to a bucket rigger, only they apply their trade while standing, sitting on or hanging from an exposed structural member.

Climbing or steel access rigger
Has all of the previous skills and responsibilities of the other 3 riggers and they must also have exceptional rope skills. They must also be very physically fit and able to pull their own body weight up into structural ceilings on belay while applying personal fall protection as they go. They must be proficient with harness positioning systems and advanced rope friction and hauling systems.

Training
Most entertainment rigging training is done either by apprenticeship or formal training through unions e.g. IATSE. The most advanced hands on Training in the United States being in Las Vegas at the Nevada Resort Association-IATSE 720 Training Trust in Nevada.

Certification
In US, the recognized entertainment rigging certification is the E.T.C.P. arena and theater rigging certification programs as well as S.P.R.A.T rope access training.
In UK the PLASA NRC (National Rigging Certificate) is the recognized entertainment rigging certification.

References

Further reading

Entertainment occupations
Lifting equipment
Material-handling equipment
Scenic design
Stagecraft